

References

External links 
 
 

P